John Carlos "JC" Gordon de los Reyes (born February 14, 1970) is the President of Ang Kapatiran Party and a senatorial candidate for the 2013 Philippine midterm election. de los Reyes was councilor in Olongapo City and the presidential candidate of the Ang Kapatiran Party for the 2010 Philippine presidential election.

Educational background and career 
He studied in Ateneo de Manila for his elementary education, and graduated in De La Salle Santiago Zobel School for high school. He finished his Bachelor of Arts in Theology at the Franciscan University of Steubenville, which is considered as one of the most orthodox Catholic Universities in the United States.

In late 1993 he taught philosophy in the Center for Research and Communication, now known as the University of Asia and the Pacific. During that time, he was under the tutelage of Father Joseph de Torre, a Spanish priest of the Holy Cross who wrote extensively on the social teachings of the Church.

In 1999 he finished his post-graduate studies in public administration from the University of the Philippines. In 2005 he finished his law degree at Saint Louis University in Baguio.

Personal life 
De Los Reyes is married to Filipino-Brazilian, Dunia Valenzuela-Delos Reyes with whom he has four children – Gabriel, Santiago, Barbara, and Julianna.

References

External links
 Will you vote for John Carlos JC de Los Reyes for President? --- 2010 Philippines Election Poll.

1970 births
Living people
Filipino people of American descent
Filipino Roman Catholics
Candidates in the 2010 Philippine presidential election
Filipino city and municipal councilors
Ang Kapatiran politicians
Nacionalista Party politicians
Franciscan University of Steubenville alumni
Saint Louis University (Philippines) alumni
University of the Philippines alumni